"My Heart Would Take You Back" is a song by British singer Shayne Ward. The song was released in the United Kingdom as a digital download on 12 April 2015. It was released as the lead single from his fourth studio album Closer (2015). The song was written by Mike Stock, Johan Kalel, Laura Walton and Shayne Ward.

Background
The song premiered on BBC Radio 2 on the Ken Bruce show on 24 February 2015 to a positive reception. Shayne Ward said of the song: "I sat down with Mike and said, 'I love The Stylistics, Temptations, The Chi-Lites and I would love to write something along the lines of that. I thought it would end up as an album track but from the moment we sent it to management, they jumped at it and said, 'We have to go with this as the lead track.'"

Music video
A music video to accompany the release of "My Heart Would Take You Back" was first released onto YouTube on 26 March 2015 at a total length of three minutes and thirty-six seconds.

Track listing

Chart performance

Weekly charts

Release history

References

2014 songs
Shayne Ward songs
Songs written by Mike Stock (musician)
2015 singles